What's Wrong with Secretary Kim is a 2018 South Korean television series starring Park Seo-joon and Park Min-young. It is based on the novel of the same title by Jung Kyung-yoon which was first published in 2013, which was then serialized into a Webtoon comic by KakaoPage in 2015. The series aired on tvN from June 6 to July 26, 2018, on Wednesdays and Thursdays for 16 episodes.

Synopsis
Lee Young-joon (Park Seo-joon) is the vice-chairman of a major corporation. His world is shaken when, one day, his highly-capable secretary, Kim Mi-so (Park Min-young), announces that she will resign from her position after working for Lee Young-joon for nine years. Young-joon then decided to do whatever he can after talking to his best friend, who happens to be a board director in his company, to make sure Mi-so stays by his side.

Throughout the journey, Lee Young-joon plans plenty of things while Kim Mi-so decides to find the elusive man from a past traumatic experience that she was a part of when she was a young child. Kim Mi-so falls in love with Lee Young-joon as they heal each other of their past traumatic experiences.

Cast

Main
 Park Seo-joon as Lee Young-joon / Lee Sung-hyun 
 Moon Woo-jin as 9-year-old Lee Sung-hyun
Vice-chairman of Yumyung Group. He is handsome and capable, but his narcissism makes it difficult for Mi-so to work with him. He realized his feelings towards Mi-so after realizing that he might lose her. He can be jealous of Mi-so when she is with his brother or with someone other than him. At one point in his life, he suffered PTSD.
 Park Min-young as Kim Mi-so
 Kim Ji-yoo as 5-year-old Kim Mi-so
A highly skilled secretary who has worked with Young-joon for nine years. She soon reciprocates Young-joon's feelings after realizing that he was a part of her childhood.

Supporting
Lee Young-joon's family
 Lee Tae-hwan as Lee Sung-yeon / Morpheus
 Bae Gang-yoo as 11-year-old Lee Sung-yeon
Young-joon's older brother and a famous author. He has a crush on Mi-so.
 Kim Byeong-ok as Chairman Lee
Go Se-won as young Chairman Lee (Ep. 11–12)
Young-joon and Sung-yeon's father. Chairman of Yumyung Group.
 Kim Hye-ok as Madame Choi
 Lee Soo-kyung as young Madame Choi (Ep. 11–12)
Young-joon and Sung-yeon's mother.

Kim Mi-so's family
 Baek Eun-hye as Kim Pil-nam
Mi-so's oldest sister who is a psychiatrist.
 Heo Sun-mi as Kim Mal-hee 
Mi-so's second oldest sister who is a urologist.
  as Kim Young-man
Mi-so's father who is a rock musician.

Yumyung Group
 Kang Ki-young as Park Yoo-sik
President of Yumyung Group, the second-in-command after the vice-chairman. Young-joon's best friend back from university. He is Young-joon's confidant and provides him with much advice drawn from personal experience. He is still in love with his ex-wife. 
 Hwang Chan-sung as Go Gwi-nam 
A deputy in Yumyung Group who later transfers to Chi-in's group. He is known for his handsome looks, elite education, being a workaholic, and extreme frugality.
 Pyo Ye-jin as Kim Ji-a 
The rookie secretary to the vice-chairman, being groomed to replace Mi-so who has announced her resignation. 
 Kim Ye-won as Sul Ma-eum 
Yoo-sik's secretary who is clumsy and careless, often comparing unfavorably to Mi-so.
 Hwang Bo-ra as Bong Se-ra 
A section head in Chi-in's team, who initially coveted the open position of secretary to the vice-chairman, and initially had a crush on Gwi-nam.
  as Jung Chi-in 
A team leader in the vice-chairman's office, who frequently organizes after-work gatherings.
  as Lee Young-ok
A member of Chi-in's team, who has a strict adherence to dieting.
  as Park Joon-hwan
A member of Chi-in's team, who is bespectacled and brags about his university education.
 Kang Hong-seok as Yang Cheol
A secretary and chauffeur to the vice-chairman, he is a man of few words. He ends up bailing out Se-ra several times.
 Bae Hyun-sung as Yun-sung Bae, an intern staff.

Special appearances
 Hong Ji-yoon as Oh Ji-ran, a famous model and onetime girlfriend of Young-joon (Ep. 1, 2, 3 & 16) 
 Choi Na-mu as woman at the Spanish Embassy party (Ep. 1)
 Shin Joo-yeon as Kim Mi-so's friend (Ep. 1)
 Park Byung-eun as Park Byung-eun, Kim Mi-so's blind date (Ep. 3)
  as a reporter who interviewed Morpheus (Ep. 4)
 Lee Chang as center director of the Art Center (Ep. 4)
  as the host of the book concert (Ep. 8)
 Jung Soo-young as an agency staff (Ep. 9)
  as a chef at a restaurant (Ep. 9)
 Seo Hyo-rim as Choi Seo-jin, Park Yoo-sik's ex-wife (Ep. 9, 11–12 & 16)
 Lee Min-ki as young Mi-so's father (Ep. 10)
 Jung So-min as young Mi-so's mother (Ep. 10)
  as Magician (Ep. 10)
 Son Seong-yoon as the kidnapper (Ep. 11–12)
 Gil Hae-yeon as the woman at the reserved parking space (Ep. 12)
  as Psychiatrist (Ep. 12) 
 Park Na-rae as the lewd devil (voice) (Ep. 13)
 Jung Yu-mi as Jung Yu-mi, a childhood friend and former classmate of Lee Young-joon (Ep. 14)
 Kim Ga-yeon and Lee Se-young as the staff who talked behind Kim Mi-so's back (Ep. 14)
 Lee Byung-joon as a wedding dress designer (Ep. 16)

Production

Development
Much of the visual styling of the series protagonists have referenced the comic version's cues, including clothing designs and reenacting the comic cover for the drama's promotional stills and images.

The first script reading was held on April 10, 2018, at Studio Dragon in Sangam-dong, Seoul, South Korea.

Maserati Korea provided the cars of Lee Young-joon, Lee Sung-yeon and Yumyong Group. The cars featured in the show include a Maserati Ghibli (driven by Yoo-sik), a Maserati Levante (driven by Sung-yeon), a Maserati GranCabrio (driven by Young-joon), and a Maserati Quattroporte (driven by Young-joon).

Promotion
The press conference for the drama was held on May 30, 2018, at the Times Square in Seoul with the attendance of the main cast and crew.

Original soundtrack

Part 1

Part 2

Part 3

Part 4

Part 5

Part 6

Part 7

Part 8

Viewership

Awards and nominations

Notes

References

External links
 

What's Wrong with Secretary Kim webtoon at TappyToon

Korean-language television shows
TVN (South Korean TV channel) television dramas
2018 South Korean television series debuts
Television series by Studio Dragon
South Korean romantic comedy television series
Television shows based on South Korean novels
2018 South Korean television series endings
South Korean workplace television series
Television series by Bon Factory Worldwide